Petronà is a comune and town in the province of Catanzaro in the Calabria region of Italy. As of 2013 it had an estimated population of 2,667.

Sources

Cities and towns in Calabria